PredictIt is a New Zealand-based online prediction market that offers exchanges on political and financial events. PredictIt is owned and operated by Victoria University of Wellington with support from Aristotle, Inc. The company's office is located in Washington, D.C.

The market was initially launched on 3 November 2014.

History
PredictIt was first launched on 3 November 2014. By March 2016, the website had approximately 29,000 active traders. The nonprofit educational project of the Victoria University of Wellington, New Zealand, "had to work around federal laws that prohibit online gambling and govern commodity futures trading." During the 2016 United States elections, PredictIt, along with other prediction market websites, received attention from various media outlets.

Trading format
PredictIt uses a continuous double auction to sell shares for each event in its markets, meaning that for every person who predicts that an event will take place, there must be another person who predicts that it will not. The site groups related predictions into a market. Operating expenses are covered by charging a fee of 10% on earnings in excess of the original investment and by charging an additional 5% withdrawal fee. PredictIt has many different categories of markets including questions about the Biden Administration, U.S. Elections, Congress, State/Local elections, and world. Questions vary from asking which political party will win certain elections, which candidate will win, what the margin of victory for the winner will be, and even what the results of future polls on Real Clear Politics and FiveThirtyEight will be.

Data-sharing program
PredictIt offers a data sharing program for members of the academic community. PredictIt has over 160 data partners, including researchers affiliated with Duke University, Harvard University, the Massachusetts Institute of Technology, the Oklahoma State University, the University of Michigan, the University of Pennsylvania, the University of Virginia, and Yale University.

Regulation
Victoria University of Wellington secured a no-action letter from the Commodity Futures Trading Commission (CFTC), eliminating the risk of prosecution for illegal online gambling. In order to secure the no-action letter, each question is limited to 5,000 traders, and there is an $850 cap on individual investments per question. These restrictions are modeled after the Iowa Electronic Markets, which previously secured a no-action letter from the Commodity Futures Trading Commission. However, there are differences in the restrictions between the two markets.

2022 CFTC Action letter 
On August 4, 2022, the CFTC announced that Victoria University has not operated PredictIt in compliance with the terms of the no-action letter and as a result the no-action letter had been withdrawn. The CFTC stated that all related and remaining listed contracts and positions on PredictIt should be closed out and/or liquidated no later than 11:59 p.m. (EDT) on February 15, 2023. In September 2022, PredictIt and Aristotle International filed suit against the CFTC in the U.S. District Court for the Western District of Texas to block the action. On January 26, 2023, the Fifth Circuit granted a temporary injunction allowing PredictIt to continue operating while the court considered further term relief for the organization.

See also
Intrade  – defunct web-based trading exchange
iPredict – a New Zealand prediction market also run by Victoria University of Wellington; closed December 2016
Metaculus – U.S.-based online prediction solicitation and aggregation engine

References

External links
 

Prediction markets
Victoria University of Wellington
Gambling companies of New Zealand
New Zealand websites
Internet properties established in 2014
New Zealand companies established in 2014